LGBT slogans are catchphrases or slogans which express support for members of the lesbian, gay, bisexual, and transgender (LGBT) communities and LGBT rights.

Slogans

See also
 Gay pride
 Pride parade
 LGBT symbols

Notes

References
 

LGBT culture
LGBT rights
LGBT-related lists
Lists of slogans